East African campaign may refer to:

East African campaign (World War I)
East African campaign (World War II)